Elizabeth Van Wie Davis (born 1958) is an American academic specializing in international affairs.

Education 
Davis received her BA in Liberal Arts from Shimer College. She obtained her PhD in Foreign Affairs from the University of Virginia in 1985. Her dissertation was a study of East Asian maritime law, titled Oceans Policy: A New Search for Cooperation.

Career 
Davis has worked at Mary Baldwin College, Illinois State University, Johns Hopkins University's SAIS Center for Chinese and American Studies in Nanjing, China, and the Asia-Pacific Center for Security Studies, a U.S. Department of Defense academic institute. 

After serving as the Director of Liberal Arts and International Studies Department at the Colorado School of Mines, in 2014 she accepted the position of Vice Dean for Research at Nazarbayev University, which she held for one year. Afterwards, she returned to the Colorado School of Mines as Professor.

Dr. Davis took a break from academia after 17 years to work for the US government on Asia issues, focusing on preventive diplomacy, including briefing US senators and congressmen, top US military officers, and foreign government leaders on China and Asia-related subjects.

Bibliography 
Ruling, Resources and Religion in China: Managing the Multiethnic State in the 21st Century. (2012) 
Islam, Oil and Geopolitics: Central Asia after September 11 (co-edited with Rouben Azizian). (2006) 
Chinese Perspectives on Sino-American Relations 1950-2000 (edited, Chinese Studies Series, 12). (2000) 
China and the Law of the Sea Convention: Follow the Sea. (1995)

References

1958 births
Living people
Shimer College alumni
University of Virginia alumni
Asian studies